Muratlı is a village in the Tarsus district of Mersin Province, Turkey. Its population as of 2019 was 176. Its main economic activity is agriculture, grapes being its principal crop.

References

Villages in Tarsus District